The 2013–14 San Francisco Dons men's basketball team represented the University of San Francisco during the 2013–14 college basketball season. It was head coach Rex Walters sixth season at San Francisco. The Dons played their home games at the War Memorial Gymnasium and were members of the West Coast Conference. They finished the season 21–12, 13–5 in WCC play to finish in a tie for second place. They advanced to the semifinals of the WCC tournament where they lost to BYU. They were invited to the National Invitation Tournament where they lost in the first round to LSU.

Before the season

Departures

Recruits

Roster

Schedule and results

|-
!colspan=12 style="background:#006633; color:#FFCC33;"| Non-Conference Regular Season

|-
!colspan=12 style="background:#006633; color:#FFCC33;"| WCC Regular Season

|-
!colspan=12 style="background:#006633; color:#FFCC33;"| WCC tournament

|-
!colspan=12 style="background:#006633; color:#FFCC33;"| NIT

Game summaries

Notre Dame de Namur
Series History: USF leads series 1-0
Broadcasters: Pat Olson & Jim Brovelli

Cleveland State
Series History: First Meeting
Broadcasters: Pat Olson & Jim Brovelli

Nevada
Series History: Nevada leads 59-51
Broadcasters: Pat Olson & Jim Brovelli

Idaho State
Series History: USF leads 4-0
Broadcasters: Pat Olson & Jim Brovelli

Montana
Series History: San Francisco leads 5-0
Broadcasters: Tom Schultz

Oregon
Series History: Oregon leads 7-2
Broadcasters: Paul Sunderland & Ernie Kent

Golden Gate Challenge: Sonoma State
Series History: San Francisco leads 7-0
Broadcasters: Pat Olson & Jim Brovelli

Golden Gate Challenge: Vermont
Series History: San Francisco leads 1-0
Broadcasters: Pat Olson & Jim Brovelli

Golden Gate Challenge: Illinois State
Series History: Illinois State leads 1-0
Broadcasters: Pat Olson & Jim Brovelli

Nicholls State
Series History: First Meeting
Broadcasters: Pat Olson & Jim Brovelli

St. John's
Series History: St. John's leads 4-3
Broadcasters: Justin Kutcher & Jim Spanarkel

American
Series History: San Francisco leads 1-0
Broadcasters: Pat Olson & Jim Brovelli

Portland
Series History: San Francisco leads 51-26
Broadcasters: Tom Glasgow & Joe Cravens

Gonzaga
Series History: Gonzaga leads series 46-22
Broadcasters: Greg Hesiter & Richard Fox

Loyola Marymount
Series History: San Francisco leads 107-39
Broadcasters: Pat Olson & Jim Brovelli

Pepperdine
Series History: San Francisco leads 71-50
Broadcasters: Barry Tompkins & Jarron Collins

Pacific
Series History: San Francisco leads 60-34
Broadcasters: Rich Cellini & John Stege

Saint Mary's
Series History: San Francisco leads 103-72
Broadcasters: Glen Kuiper & Dan Belluomini

BYU
Broadcasters: Roxy Bernstein & Corey Williams
Series History: BYU leads 8-7

San Diego
Series History: San Francisco leads 37-34
Broadcasters: Pat Olson & Jim Brovelli

Santa Clara
Series History: Santa Clara leads 111-101
Broadcasters: Glen Kuiper & Dan Belluomini

Portland
Series History: San Francisco leads 52-26
Broadcasters: Rich Cellini & John Stege

Gonzaga
Series History: Gonzaga leads 47-22
Broadcasters: Glen Kuiper & Stan Morrison

References

San Francisco Dons men's basketball seasons
San Francisco
San Francisco
San Francisco Dons
San Francisco Dons